John White (born 28 July 1955) is a former Australian rules footballer who played with North Melbourne in the Victorian Football League (VFL).

Notes

External links 

Living people
1955 births
Australian rules footballers from Victoria (Australia)
North Melbourne Football Club players